Khawdan is a sub-district located in Yarim District, Ibb Governorate, Yemen. Khawdan had a population of 12753 as of  2004.

References 

Sub-districts in Yarim District